Darbari Lal DAV Model School, ND Block, Pitam Pura, Delhi, India, is a private co-educational school. The school came into existence in 1981 in a small rented building with 500 students. It now has 4928 students with 157 teachers. It provides advanced knowledge to children. It has started the CBSE-i curriculum.

See also
Education in India
Education in Delhi
List of schools in Delhi
CBSE

References

External links
 Official website
 DAV College Managing Committee website

Educational institutions established in 1981
North Delhi district
1981 establishments in Delhi
Schools affiliated with the Arya Samaj